Annanukku Jai is a 2018 Tamil-language political satire film directed by Rajkumar and produced by Vetrimaaran. The film stars Dinesh and Mahima Nambiar. The music was composed by Arrol Corelli, while the film released on 31 August 2018.

Cast

 Dinesh as Matta Sekar
 Mahima Nambiar as Sundari
 Radha Ravi as Parasuraman 
 Mayilswamy as Murugesan
 Vaiyapuri as Narayanan
 Sriranjini as Parasuraman's wife
 Anjali Rao as Veni
 Ramachandran Durairaj
 Sai Dheena as Selva
 Radha as Sekar's mother
 Hari Krishnan  as Annaconda
 Supergood Subramani  as Subba Rao
 Balambika as Sundari's mother
 Vijayamuthu as Selva's henchman
 Tiger Garden Thangadurai as Guna
 Pangu as Vijayamuthu
 Meeran Mitheen as Damodaran
 Pattabi as Pattabi
 Munnar Ramesh
 Dhanasekar
 TSR

Production
In December 2014, Dhanush and Vetrimaaran announced that they would jointly produce a new film titled Annanukku Jai starring Dinesh, which would be directed by debutant Rajkumar. Later in the month, the team also agreed terms with Mahima Nambiar to play the film's lead actress. However, the producers dropped the film and progress remained stagnant throughout 2015.Dinesh began working on the film again in February 2016, with a schedule held in Vettavalam, Tiruvannamalai District.It was theatrically released in India on 31 August 2018, receiving mostly positive reviews from critics and from the audience.

Release
The satellite rights of the film were sold to STAR Vijay.

References

External links
 

2010s Tamil-language films
Indian political satire films
2018 films
Fox Star Studios films
2010s political satire films